Kaushalendra Kumar is a Member of Parliament for the Nalanda constituency of the India Lok Sabha. He is a representative of  the Janata Dal (United) party. He was first elected in the 2009 Indian general election, when he succeeded and was nominated by Nitish Kumar in the constituency. He again won Nalanda seat in 2014 Indian general election. He won with a narrow margin of 9627 votes. In 2019 general election he defeated his nearest rival by 2,56,137 votes. He got a record 5,40,888 votes.

Personal life 
He is a supporter of agrarian and social reform. His father was a farmer. Kaushalendra Kumar is married to Raveena Kumari in 1979. The couple has two sons and one daughter. Their son is studying in IIT Roorkee. His wife is a District Council member from Nalanda.

Education 
He took his education from S.P.M. College Nalanda, Magadh University. He has a Bachelor of Arts. He also has an Agriculture Education from Kisan College, Sohsarai, Nalanda.

References

References 
 

People from Bihar
1959 births
Living people
Janata Dal (United) politicians
India MPs 2009–2014
Lok Sabha members from Bihar
People from Nalanda
India MPs 2014–2019
Magadh University alumni
India MPs 2019–present